Paddy Lane (7 September 1934 – 23 July 2012) was an Irish Fianna Fáil politician. He was president of the Irish Farmers' Association from 1976 to 1980.

He was elected to the European Parliament at the 1989 European election for the Munster constituency. He was a member of the Committee on Agriculture, Fisheries and Rural Development in the European Parliament. He lost his seat at the 1994 European election.

Lane played rugby union for Ireland, earning a single cap in 1964.

References

External links

1934 births
2012 deaths
Irish sportsperson-politicians
Politicians from County Clare
Fianna Fáil MEPs
MEPs for the Republic of Ireland 1989–1994
Ireland international rugby union players
Rugby union players from County Clare